Port Hudson may refer to:

Port Hudson, Louisiana, an unincorporated community and scene of the 1863 Siege of Port Hudson
Port Hudson, Missouri, an unincorporated community